Edward Hawkins (1789–1882) was an English churchman and academic.

Edward Hawkins may also refer to:

 Edward Hawkins (architect) (1902–1991), designer and developer of Unosian residential houses
 Edward Hawkins (New York politician) (1829–1908), New York politician
 Edward Hawkins (numismatist) (1780–1867), English numismatist and antiquary

See also
 Ed Hawkins (disambiguation)